The Ataxian is a documentary film of Kyle Bryant, a sufferer of Friedreich's ataxia. The film premiered at the Dances With Films Festival in 2015.

Synopsis

The movie tells how Bryant lost the ability to play his favorite sports and walk. Bryant takes up cycling, biking long distances.

When Bryant is finally relegated to a wheelchair, he enlists the help of three friends and they embark on the  Race Across America.

The outcome inspires a movement, known as rideATAXIA.

References

2015 documentary films
2015 independent films
American documentary films
American independent films
2010s English-language films
2010s American films